Cristoforo Giacobazzi (died 1540) was an Italian Roman Catholic bishop and cardinal.

Biography

Giacobazzi was born in Rome, the son of Jacomo Giacobazzi and Camilla de Astallis.</ref> He was the nephew of Cardinal Domenico Giacobazzi, who took responsibility for Cristoforo's education.

On 21 February 1517 he became a canon of the cathedral chapter of St. Peter's Basilica. He was elected bishop of Cassano on 23 March 1523 when his uncle resigned the see in his favor. He later became an auditor of the Roman Rota. From October 1534 to December 1536, he was a datary. On 23 August 1535 he was named to a commission charged with studying reform of the Roman Curia.

Pope Paul III created him a cardinal priest in the consistory of 22 December 1536. He received the red hat on 23 December 1536, and the titular church of Sant'Anastasia on 15 January 1537. On 6 September 1537 he opted for the titular church of Sant'Eustachio, a deaconry raised pro illa vice to title, though he maintained his former titular church in commendam.

On 10 December 1537 he, along with Cardinal Rodolfo Pio da Carpi, was named papal legate to restore the peace between Charles V, Holy Roman Emperor and Francis I of France (though the cardinals were not informed of the legation until the consistory celebrated in Piacenza on 30 April 1538). On 21 April 1539 he was made legate to Perugia and Umbria.

He died in Perugia on 7 October 1540 and was buried there.

References

1540 deaths
16th-century Italian cardinals
Year of birth unknown
Bishops of Cassano
16th-century Italian Roman Catholic bishops